Anthony Rains "Tony" Berg (born October 21, 1954) is an American musician, record producer, and A&R representative, in which role he has been described as an "industry guru".

Berg's music career began in the late 1970s as a session guitarist who appeared on notable releases by artists including Air Supply and Debby Boone, as well as on The Rocky Horror Picture Show LP and several Muppet Show records. In the early 1980s, Berg founded Zeitgeist Studios. His first major success was with Michael Penn's 1989 debut March. From there Berg went on to produce for Edie Brickell, Public Image Ltd, Altered State, Aimee Mann, and numerous other artists.

In the early 1990s, Berg became an A&R executive with Geffen Records, where he played a role in signing artists including Beck, Wild Colonials, Black Rebel Motorcycle Club, and At the Drive-In. During this time he continued to produce records and play on a wide variety of releases, among them Peter Gabriel's Up.

In 2004 Berg founded Three Records with industry veteran Michael Rosenblatt and producer Eric Valentine. Their first release was Mellowdrone's Box.

Personal life
His brothers are Pulitzer Prize-winning biographer and journalist A. Scott Berg, and Jeff Berg, CEO of International Creative Management. His daughter is musician Z Berg.

Discography

References

1954 births
American male guitarists
American rock guitarists
Record producers from Connecticut
Living people